Abr or ABR may refer to:

Technology
 Available Bit Rate, a service used in ATM networks
 Average bitrate, the average amount of data transferred per second
 Area border router, in the Open Shortest Path First protocol
 Adaptive bit rate, a method of video transmission through the Internet
 Anaerobic baffled reactor, a type of decentralized wastewater system

Transport
 Abercynon North railway station, a closed railway station formerly serving the village of Abercynon in the Cynon Valley, South Wales
 ABR, IATA code for Aberdeen Regional Airport, an airport east of Aberdeen, South Dakota, United States
 ABR, ICAO designation for ASL Airlines Ireland, a freight airline
 Athens Line, a railroad operating in the U.S. state of Georgia

Other uses
 Abr, a village in Iran
 Accredited Buyer Representative, a designation of the National Association of Realtors
 Abron dialect, a major dialect of the Akan language of Central Ghana
 Addison Brown (1830–1913), American jurist and botanist (standard author abbreviation: A. Br.)
 American Board of Radiology
 Auditory brainstem response, an electrical signal evoked from the brainstem of a human or other mammal 
 August Burns Red, a metalcore band from Lancaster, Pennsylvania
 Australian Biblical Review, academic journal
 Australian Book Review, a literary magazine
 Australian Business Register, government body tasked with issuing and maintaining Australian Business Numbers (ABNs)